Rock goldenrod is a common name for several plants and may refer to:

Petradoria pumila, native to the western United States
Solidago rupestris, native to the eastern United States